Phyllonorycter nicellii is a moth of the family Gracillariidae. It is found in most of Europe, except the Balkan Peninsula and the Mediterranean islands.

Description
The wingspan is 7–8 mm The forewings are shining golden-ochreous, sometimes suffused with brown ; base pale ; a fascia at 1/4, another in middle, three posterior costal and two dorsal wedge-shaped spots shining whitish, anteriorly blackish-margined, first pair of spots often connected ; an oval blackish apical spot. Hindwings are grey.

Biology
and the moths are on wing in May and August in two generations.

The larvae feed on Corylus avellana and Corylus colurna mining the leaves of the host plant creating a lower-surface tentiform mine, usually between two side veins. The pupa is formed in a white cocoon in a corner of the mine. It is attached to both the roof and the floor of the mine. The frass is deposited in an opposite corner.

References

External links
 bladmineerders.nl 
 Fauna Europaea

nicellii
Moths described in 1851
Moths of Europe
Taxa named by Henry Tibbats Stainton